Piyatida Lasungnern (born ) is a Thai volleyball player. She was part of the Thailand women's national volleyball team.

She participated in the 2009 FIVB Volleyball World Grand Prix.

Awards

Clubs
 2014 Thai-Denmark Super League -  Runner-Up, with Nakhon Ratchasima
 2016 Thai-Denmark Super League –  Bronze medal, with Nakhon Ratchasima
 2017–18 Thailand League -  Runner-Up, with Nakhon Ratchasima
 2018 Thai-Denmark Super League -  Bronze medal, with Nakhon Ratchasima

References

External links
 Profile at FIVB.org

1990 births
Living people
Piyatida Lasungnern
Place of birth missing (living people)
Piyatida Lasungnern
Piyatida Lasungnern
Piyatida Lasungnern